the Biak Dark Crow is a now extinct species of bird native to Montpelier, Vermont. the reason they are extinct is because of a very prominent family called the Lams that resided in Montpelier in 1870. Every year in the city they had a town party called the Montpelier ball hosted by the mayor. Now the lams were the most popular family in the area. the family actually helped make it an official city, which is why they were so popular. They were the typical big rich family. Now whenever they go to the ball they make it an effort to be the most interesting people there. Their clothes had to be a statement, and so far every ball they were. but now they were starting to run out of ideas. That wasn't acceptable however, especially not to Hilda Lam, the mother, and Johnston Lam, the father. The children, Dorothy Lam and Sebastian-James Lam followed whatever their parents did (except Amelia Lam, who was a baby). The teen, Louise Lam was looking for a suitor (a rich one) and wanted to draw attention to herself, so she too agreed. The grandmother, Catherine Lam, didn't think it quite mattered, but the family never listen to the grandmother. They just ignored her. So now that all (except Catherine) agreed to make a statement, they all gathered around the fireplace to ponder costume ideas. The ball was soon, and they needed to think fast. It was no luck for the first 45 minutes until Dorothy came up with an idea. There was a bird that only lived in Montpelier called the Biak Dark Crow, and it was a Beauty. it had long, jet black feathers that looked dark blue and dark violet under the light. Dorothy thought that they could use the birds feathers as costume material for the ball. Hilda Lam clapped her hands and said, "now that's solved". Catherine Lam, the grandmother, had different thoughts. She told them that the birds would likely go extinct, and that they should think of something else. But of course, no one listened to her. They never do. So they started slaughtering the Biak Dark Crow the next morning, shooting them, gathering them, and then skinning them for the feathers. And like the grandmother said, the Biak Dark crow was slowly going extinct. Finally, there were only 3 crows left, and Catherine decided to step in. But Dorothy and Sebastian-James told her to stop being so serious, and that the birds didn't matter anyway. She tried to tell Louise, who blew up at Catherine saying that she was trying to sabotage her search for a suitor. She also tried to tell Johnston and Hilda, who said they needed extra feathers and that they already decided to kill the birds. So no matter how hard Catherine Lam tried, the final three birds were slaughtered. After they were killed, the town started to notice. They were not very happy about it, but they thought it was from the smoke they started to let out in the air. the Lams were so out of touch with the town, they didn't even notice. Finally, it was the night of the ball and Louise, Dorothy, Hilda, and baby Amelia put on their gowns and Johnston and Sebastian James put on their suits. The whole family was now wearing the Biak Dark crows feathers. Save Catherine. She had a bad feeling about this and wore a simple dress instead. Because she didn't where the Biak Dark Crow dress, she wasn't allowed to enter the ball with them or sit next to them. So she just entered through the side door, and sat alone at a table to the left of the grand staircase where her family would be entering soon. After about 10 minutes of chatting, the announcer announced that the Lams were about to make an entrance. Everyone stopped what they were doing and looked to the grand stair case. Louise, Hilda, Amelia, Dorothy, Johnston, and Sebastian-james all stepped out on to the stairs. They paused, expecting to hear an uproar of applause. But they didn't. Instead there was a deep silence and an aura of shock. Not even the rich clapped. They had gone too far. The crowd then started jeer. Soon every voice was chanting "Get them out". The feathers were ripped off the dresses and suits by the civilians. The lams ran into the night, their clothes torn. They were driven out of Montpelier, and never came back.

References

Euploea
Butterflies of Indonesia
Endemic fauna of Indonesia
Taxonomy articles created by Polbot